Events from the year 1908 in France.

Incumbents
President: Armand Fallières 
President of the Council of Ministers: Georges Clemenceau

Events
12 January – A long-distance radio message is sent from the Eiffel Tower for the first time.
21 March – Henri Farman pilots the first passenger flight.

Sport
13 July – Tour de France begins.
9 August – Tour de France ends, won by Lucien Petit-Breton.

Births

January to March
9 January – Simone de Beauvoir, author and philosopher (died 1986)
12 January – Jean Delannoy, actor, screenwriter and film director (died 2008)
26 January – Stéphane Grappelli, jazz violinist (died 1997)
31 January – Simonne Mathieu, tennis player (died 1980)
12 February – Jean Effel, painter, illustrator and journalist (died 1982)
26 February – Jean-Pierre Wimille, motor racing driver and resistance member (died 1949)
27 February – Pierre Brunet, rowing coxswain and Olympic medallist (died 1979)
29 February – Balthus, artist (died 2001)
5 March – Christian Boussus, tennis player (died 2003)
8 March – Raymond Dronne, politician (died 1991)
14 March – Maurice Merleau-Ponty, phenomenological philosopher (died 1961)
20 March – Roger Trinquier, army officer (died 1986)
25 March – Henri Rochereau, politician and European Commissioner (died 1999)

April to June
12 April – André Martinet, linguist (died 1999)
21 April – Louis Hostin, weightlifter and Olympic champion (died 1998)
5 May – Jacques Massu, General (died 2002)
29 May – Pierre-Henri Teitgen, lawyer, professor and politician (died 1997)
30 May – André Cheuva, soccer player (died 1989)
2 June – Marcel Langiller, international soccer player (died 1980
12 June – Henri Rol-Tanguy, communist and leader in the French Resistance (died 2002)

July to September
2 July – Léon Arthur Elchinger, Bishop of Strasbourg (died 1998)
5 July – Henri, comte de Paris, Orléanist claimant to the French throne (died 1999)
12 July – Alain Cuny, actor (died 1994)
25 July – Robert-Ambroise-Marie Carré, priest and author (died 2004)
5 August – Shlomo Pines, French-born Israeli scholar of Jewish and Islamic philosophy (died 1990)
18 August – Edgar Faure, politician, essayist, historian, and memoirist (died 1988)
22 August – Henri Cartier-Bresson, photographer (died 2004)
28 August – Robert Merle, novelist (died 2004)
2 September – Fania Fénelon, pianist, composer and cabaret singer (died 1983)
8 September – Luc Étienne (Périn), writer (died 1984).
19 September – Paul Bénichou, writer, critic and literary historian (died 2001)
19 September – Robert Lecourt, jurist, fourth President of the European Court of Justice (died 2004)
25 September – Jacqueline Audry, film director (died 1977)
25 September – Roger Beaufrand, Olympic gold medal-winning cyclist (died 2007)

October to December
30 October – Marcel Béalu, writer (died 1993)
1 November – Sylvia Bataille, actress (died 1993)
4 November – Pauline Trigère, fashion designer (died 2002)
6 November – Françoise Dolto, physician and psychoanalyst (died 1988)
16 November – Sœur Emmanuelle, nun and aid worker (died 2008)
19 November – Jean-Yves Daniel-Lesur, organist and composer (died 2002)
24 November – Simone de la Chaume, golfer (died 2001).
10 December – Olivier Messiaen, composer, organist and ornithologist (died 1992)
17 December – Raymond Louviot, cyclist (died 1969)
31 December – Pauline de Rothschild, fashion icon and tastemaker (died 1976)

Full date unknown
Gilbert Degrémont, water treatment expert (died 1974)
Célestin Lainé, Breton nationalist and collaborator (died 1983)

Deaths
29 January – François-Marie-Benjamin Richard, Archbishop of Paris (born 1819)
13 April Victor André Cornil, pathologist (born 1837)
7 May – Ludovic Halévy, author and playwright (born 1834)
25 August – Henri Becquerel, physicist, Nobel Prize laureate (born 1852)
14 November – Denis Jean Achille Luchaire, historian (born 1846)
20 November – Marie-Louis-Antoine-Gaston Boissier, classical scholar (born 1823)
27 November – Jean Albert Gaudry, geologist and palaeontologist (born 1827)
5 December – Ernest Hébert, painter (born 1817)
Full date unknown – Jacques-Eugène Feyen, painter (born 1815)

References

1900s in France